The Boys from Leningrad is a 1954 Soviet comedy film directed by Semyon Timoshenko.

Plot 
In the center of the story is the football team "Blue Arrows", successfully performing in the cup of the syndicate of the Soviet trade unions. But striker Alexander Vesnushkin doubts the victory of the team in the finals. The alarmist leaves and his brother Vasily is put in his place. The outcome of the long-awaited match is under threat.

Cast 
 Georgy Vitsin as Vasya Vesnushkin (as G. Vitsin)
 Vsevolod Kuznetsov as Sasha Vesnushkin (as V. Kutnetsov)
 Elena Tyapkina as Vesnushkina (as Ye. Tyapkina)
 Pavel Kadochnikov as Dedushkin Svetlanov (as P. Kadochnikov)
 Tatyana Konyukhova as Valya Oljeshko (as T. Konyukhova)
 Valentina Ushakova as Galina Kartashova (as V. Ushakova)
 Mark Bernes as Lev Kolomyagin, trener (as M. Bernes)
 Konstantin Adashevsky as Ivan Innokentovich, direktor zavoda (as K. Adashevskiy)
 Vladimir Belokurov as Vasiliy Tsvetkov, rezhisyor (as V. Belokurov)
 Pavel Pol as Dnjeprovskiy (as P. Pol)
 Boris Kokovkin as Babushkin professor (as B. Kokovkin)
 Aleksandr Zhukov as Spiridon Violjetov (as A. Zhukov)
 Elvira Lutsenko as Lyubov Maljutkina (as E. Lutsenko)
 Andrey Tutyshkin as Pyotr Andreyevich (as A. Tutyshkin)

References

External links 
 

1954 comedy films
1954 films
1950s sports comedy films
Films scored by Isaak Dunayevsky
Russian association football films
Russian boxing films
1950s Russian-language films
Soviet association football films
Soviet sports comedy films